"PWAA" may refer to:

Polish Women's Alliance of America, a fraternal benefit society.
Phoenix Wright: Ace Attorney, a court-based video game.
 Pro Wrestling Alliance Australia, an independent professional wrestling promotion